{{DISPLAYTITLE:3-hydroxypropionate dehydrogenase (NADP+)}}

3-hydroxypropionate dehydrogenase (NADP+) is an enzyme with systematic name 3-hydroxypropionate:NADP+ oxidoreductase. This enzyme catalyses the following chemical reaction

 3-hydroxypropionate + NADP+  malonate semialdehyde + NADPH + H+

This enzyme catalyses the reduction of malonate semialdehyde to 3-hydroxypropionate, which is a key step in the 3-hydroxypropionate and the 3-hydroxypropionate/4-hydroxybutyrate cycles, autotrophic CO2 fixation pathways found in some green non-sulfur phototrophic bacteria and archaea, respectively. The enzyme from Chloroflexus aurantiacus is bifunctional, and also catalyses the upstream reaction in the pathway, EC 1.2.1.75. Different from EC 1.1.1.59, 3-hydroxypropionate dehydrogenase (NAD+), by cofactor preference.

References

External links 
 

EC 1.1.1